McHardy is a surname. Notable people with the surname include:

Alexander Anderson McHardy (1868–1958), British Army general
Allan McHardy (1914–1986), Australian rules footballer
David McHardy (born 1970), New Zealand cricketer
Emmet Charles McHardy (1904–1933), New Zealand Catholic missionary
George McHardy, Scottish footballer
Hugh McHardy (fl. 1885), Scottish international footballer
Iain McHardy (1913–2000), Scottish clergyman
Roger McHardy (born 1952), Australian rules footballer
Todd McHardy (born 1977), Australian rules footballer
William McHardy (1911–2000), Scottish biblical scholar

Other uses 

 Geniatech v. McHardy, a 2018 German court case looking at licensing infringements in relation to the Linux kernel